The Women's Hockey Champions Challenge I was an international field hockey tournament, played every two years. It was introduced in 2002 by the International Hockey Federation in order to broaden hockey's competitive base at world level. The Champions Challenge was replaced by the Women's FIH Hockey World League in 2014 after eight editions.

Results

Summaries

Successful national teams

* = host nation

Team appearances

References

 
Champions Challenge I
Recurring sporting events established in 2002
Recurring sporting events disestablished in 2014